The 2009 Open de Rennes was a professional tennis tournament played on indoor hard courts. It was the fourth edition of the tournament which was part of the 2009 ATP Challenger Tour. It took place in Rennes, France between 12 and 18 October 2009.

ATP entrants

Seeds

 Rankings are as of October 5, 2009.

Other entrants
The following players received wildcards into the singles main draw:
  Charles-Antoine Brézac
  Romain Jouan
  Gianni Mina
  Julien Obry

The following players received entry from the qualifying draw:
  Rabie Chaki
  Jérôme Haehnel
  Jerzy Janowicz
  Rameez Junaid

Champions

Singles

 Alejandro Falla def.  Thierry Ascione, 6–3, 6–2

Doubles

 Eric Butorac /  Lovro Zovko def.  Kevin Anderson /  Dominik Hrbatý, 6–4, 3–6, [10–6]

External links
Official website
ITF Search 
2009 Draws

Open de Rennes
Open de Rennes
2009 in French tennis